Çiftlikköy is a village in the District of Köşk, Aydın Province, Turkey. As of 2010, it had a population of 1626 people.

References

Villages in Köşk District